Gerrit Van De Ruit (12 September 1911 – 30 July 1981) was a Dutch racing cyclist. He rode in the 1937 Tour de France.

References

1911 births
1981 deaths
Dutch male cyclists
Place of birth missing